Graham Herbert Purvis (born 12 October 1961) is a former New Zealand rugby union player. A prop, Purvis represented Thames Valley and Waikato at a provincial level, and was a member of the New Zealand national side, the All Blacks, from 1989 to 1993. He played 28 matches for the All Blacks including two internationals.

References

1961 births
Living people
New Zealand rugby union players
New Zealand international rugby union players
Waikato rugby union players
Rugby union props
Rugby union players from Waikato